Andrés Carillo (born 16 August 1980) is a Cuban fencer. He competed in the individual épée event at the 2004 Summer Olympics.

References

1980 births
Living people
Cuban male épée fencers
Olympic fencers of Cuba
Fencers at the 2004 Summer Olympics
Pan American Games medalists in fencing
Pan American Games gold medalists for Cuba
Fencers at the 2003 Pan American Games
20th-century Cuban people
21st-century Cuban people